Kolli. S. Ravindra, popularly known as Bobby Kolli, is an Indian film director and screenwriter who works in Telugu cinema. He won Best Debut Director Award for Power (2014) at Santosham Film Awards.

Early life and career
K. S. Ravindra was born and brought up in Guntur. After graduating with a B. Com degree, Ravindra started his film career in 2003 and joined writer Chinna Krishna. He went on to work under several directors including Dasaradh and Gopichand Malineni. Ravindra made his directorial debut with Power (2014), starring Ravi Teja.

His 2016 directorial, Sardaar Gabbar Singh, starring Pawan Kalyan was a commercial failure. His next film, Jai Lava Kusa (2017) where Jr NTR essayed three roles, was a blockbuster at the box office, grossing over 100 crore.

In 2019, Ravindra directed Venky Mama, starring Venkatesh and Naga Chaitanya. Despite receiving mixed reviews, the film was a profitable venture. Karthik Kumar of Hindustan Times wrote, "Ravindra tries to milk the real life family bond between Venkatesh and Chaitanya in Venky Mama, which relies heavily on the camaraderie between its lead actors." Hemanth Kumar in his review for Firstpost opined, "In his attempt to blend humour and sentiment, KS Ravindra (Bobby) turns Venky Mama into a bland drama, where the narrative moves from one set piece to another without leaving a strong impression."

His next film, Waltair Veerayya, starring Chiranjeevi and Ravi Teja, released in January 2023 and received mostly positive reviews.

Personal life 
Ravindra is married to Anusha Dronavalli, the elder sister of chess player, Harika Dronavalli. The couple has a daughter born in 2018.

Filmography

References

External links
 
 

Indian male screenwriters
Telugu screenwriters
Living people
1983 births
Screenwriters from Andhra Pradesh
People from Guntur district
Film directors from Andhra Pradesh
Telugu film directors
Santosham Film Awards winners